Cunhinga is a town and municipality in Bié Province in Angola. The municipality had a population of 73,826 in 2014.

History
During the colonial period, the town was called Vouga.

References

Populated places in Bié Province
Municipalities of Angola